Barm Shur-e Olya (also Romanized as Barm Shūr-e ‘Olyā; also known as Barm-e Shūr-e Bālā and Barm Shūr-e Bālā) is a village in Qarah Bagh Rural District, in the Central District of Shiraz County, Fars Province, Iran. At the 2006 census, its population was 957, in 236 families.

References 

Populated places in Shiraz County